Dasht-e Zahmatkeshan (also Romanized as Dasht-e Zaḩmatkeshān) is a village in Kavirat Rural District, Chatrud District, Kerman County, Kerman Province, Iran. At the 2006 census, its population was 703, in 118 families.

References 

Populated places in Kerman County